The 2016 presidential campaign of Mike Huckabee, the 44th Governor of Arkansas, began on May 5, 2015 at an event in his hometown of Hope, Arkansas. Huckabee's candidacy for the Republican nomination in the 2016 Presidential election was his second, after having previously run in 2008.  Following a disappointing showing in the Iowa caucuses, Huckabee ended his run on February 1, 2016.

Background

2008 Presidential election

Huckabee was a candidate for the Republican nomination for the Presidency in 2008. In the number of states won and popular vote, Huckabee came in third behind former Massachusetts governor (and future 2012 nominee) Mitt Romney and eventual nominee Arizona senator John McCain. In terms of total delegate count, he came in second behind McCain.

Post-2008 election

Following his defeat in the 2008 election, Huckabee became the host of the eponymous show, Huckabee on Fox News Channel (FNC). In a November 19, 2008, article by the Associated Press, Huckabee addressed the possibility of running for president in 2012. He said, "I'm not ruling anything out for the future, but I'm not making any specific plans". A June 2009 CNN/Opinion Research Corporation national poll showed Huckabee as the 2012 presidential co-favorite of the Republican electorate along with Palin and Romney. An October 2009 poll of Republicans by Rasmussen Reports put Huckabee in the lead with 29%, followed by Romney on 24% and Palin on 18%. On May 14, 2011, Huckabee announced on his FNC show that he would not be a candidate for the GOP presidential nomination in 2012. Despite his high national poll numbers and being seen by many as the front runner, Huckabee declined to run, saying, "All the factors say 'go', but my heart says 'no'."
 
Several political commentators speculated that Huckabee might be ready for another presidential run in 2016. He had been hindered by a lack of money in 2008 but with changes to federal election law allowing SuperPACs to pour large sums of money into a race he might be better positioned to stay in the race.  Huckabee has in addition earned personal wealth since 2008 on the lecture circuit and his TV and radio shows. He ended his daily radio show in December 2013 which strengthened speculations about a presidential bid. Huckabee indicated in September 2014 that he would make the decision on whether to run early in 2015. In January 2015, Huckabee ended his show on FNC to prepare for his possible run in the 2016 presidential election.

Campaign

On May 5, 2015, Huckabee officially declared his candidacy at a rally in his hometown of Hope, Arkansas.

In September Ted Cruz visited Kentucky in support of the release of Kim Davis, but reportedly was blocked by an aide to Huckabee from appearing alongside her.

On November 8, 2015, Huckabee participated at the National Religious Liberties Conference alongside Bobby Jindal and Ted Cruz, and said that "our religious liberties are under assault". Conservative radio host Kevin Swanson, who hosted the conference, advocated for the execution of homosexuals in his speech. Two other speakers at the conference, Reverend Phillip Kayser and Joel McDurmon, have also spoken of the death penalty for homosexual acts.

In the 2016 Iowa Republican caucuses, Huckabee finished in ninth place with 3,345 votes, or 1.8% of the votes cast. He subsequently withdrew from the campaign.

Endorsements
U.S. Governors (current and former)

U.S. Senators (current)

U.S. Representatives

Statewide officials

State legislators

Republican National Committee members
 Arkansas: Jonathan Barnett

Celebrities, commentators, and activists

See also
 Political positions of Mike Huckabee
 Republican Party presidential primaries, 2016
 Republican Party presidential candidates, 2016

References

External links

Huckabee, Mike
Mike Huckabee